is a Japanese television drama based on the  novels by mystery writer . It narrates the events and cases encountered by Kaoru Utsumi, a rookie detective, and Manabu Yukawa, a university associate professor, as the two pair up to solve many mysterious cases. A special episode titled "Galileo Episode 0", set 3 years before the television series, aired on October 4, 2008, on the same day as the release of the film Suspect X.

A second series began airing on Fuji TV on April 15, 2013, and ended with an adaption of the novel Salvation of a Saint. The second movie, titled , premiered in both Japan and Hong Kong on June 29, 2013.

Premise
Kaoru Utsumi, a rookie detective who has just been reassigned to the criminal division, finds the investigation of her first murder case stalled by seemingly-supernatural phenomena surrounding the event. She seeks help from Shunpei Kusanagi, a senior detective at the police headquarter famous as a "Mystery Hunter". Kusanagi, however, reveals to Utsumi that he was only able to solve the cases thanks to his college friend, Teito University professor Manabu Yukawa. Yukawa is a tall, handsome, brilliant but eccentric scientist who is interested in nothing but physics, while Utsumi is a hot-blooded detective with a strong sense of justice. Together, the odd pair solves many difficult and seemingly impossible events with their individual talents.

Cast

Season 1
 Masaharu Fukuyama as 
 Ko Shibasaki as 
 Kazuki Kitamura as 
 Hiroshi Shinagawa as 
 Ikkei Watanabe as 
 Miki Maya as

Season 2
 Masaharu Fukuyama as 
 Yuriko Yoshitaka as 
 Yu Sawabe as 
 Yuto Marick Yasuhara as

Guests

Season 1
 1st episode: Toshiaki Karasawa as 
 2nd episode: Mantaro Koichi as 
 3rd episode: Ryōko Hirosue as 
 4th episode: Shingo Katori (SMAP) as 
Sora Aoi - victim of 4th episode
 5th episode: Suzuka Ohgo as 
Miki Mizuno - wife of victim of 5th episode
 6th episode: Maki Horikita as 
Hirofumi Arai - a fortune teller, stalking Remi
 7th episode: Kyoko Fukada as 
Shigeyuki Sato as 
 8th episode: Yumiko Shaku as 
 9th and final episodes: Hiroshi Kume as 
 Guests for Episode Φ (Zero)
Masami Nagasawa as 
Ayaka Komatsu as 
Karina as 
Keizo Kanie as

Season 2
 1st episode: Takao Osawa as 
 2nd episode: Haruna Kawaguchi as 
 3rd episode: Yuko Oshima as 
 4th episode: Seiichi Tanabe as 
 Atsuya Furuta - Yanagisawa's training partner
 6th episode: Yui Natsukawa as 
 7th episode: Yuu Kashii as 
 8th episode: Yū Aoi as 
 9th episode: Katsuhisa Namase as 
 10th episode: Yūki Amami as

Episodes

Season 1

Season 2
{| class="wikitable" style="width:98%;"
|- style="border-bottom:3px solid #CCF"
! Episode !! Title !! Writer !! Director !! Original airdate

|}

Ratings

Video game
An adventure game based on the series was developed by Tomcat System and published by D3Publisher for Nintendo DS on October 16, 2008.

References

External links

2007 Japanese television series debuts
2015 Japanese television series endings
Japanese drama television series
2000s crime drama television series
Television shows set in Japan
Laboratories in fiction
Fiction about murder
Television shows written by Yasushi Fukuda
Fuji TV dramas
Television shows based on Japanese novels
2010s crime drama television series
Television shows based on works by Keigo Higashino